The Charm School is a lost 1921 American silent comedy film starring Wallace Reid. Produced by Famous Players-Lasky and distributed through Paramount Pictures this James Cruze directed film was based on a 1920 Broadway stage play and novel by Alice Duer Miller that starred veteran actress Minnie Dupree. It is currently a lost film. It was filmed on the campus of Pomona College in Claremont, California.

Plot
As summarized in a film publication, when Mrs. Rolles (Farrington) insists that she will not have Austin Bevans (Reid) as a son-in-law, he insists that she will. But when his aunt dies and leaves Austin a girl's boarding school in her will, Austin gives up his suit of Susie Rolles (Bains) and decides to run the school. Under his aunt's regime the girls studied microbes, etc., but Austin turns it into a charm school where the girls are taught dancing, fencing, and grace in general. Elsie (Lee), one of the students, immediately falls in love with Austin, but he fails to respond. She then tries to vamp him, but when Austin does not fall she tells him directly that she loves him. Elsie's uncle is very interested in the young Austin. When Mrs. Rolles hears of how well he is getting along, she tries to patch things up between Austin and her daughter Susie, and tells Elsie that the two are engaged. While Elsie is brokenhearted, in the end all turns out well for her and Austin.

Cast

Wallace Reid - Austin Bevans
Lila Lee - Elsie
Adele Farrington - Mrs. Rolles
Beulah Bains - Susie Rolles
Edwin Stevens - Homer Johns
Grace Morse - Miss Hayes
Patricia Magee - Sally Boyd
Lincoln Stedman - George Boyd
Kate Toncray - Miss Curtis
Minna Redman - Miss Tevis
Snitz Edwards - Mr. Boyd
Helen Pillsbury - Mrs. Boyd
Tina Marshall - Europia

Remake
The story was remade in 1936 as the film Collegiate.

References

External links

lobby poster for The Charm School(Wayback Machine)

1921 films
American silent feature films
Lost American films
Films directed by James Cruze
Famous Players-Lasky films
Silent American comedy films
1921 comedy films
American black-and-white films
Films based on works by Alice Duer Miller
1921 lost films
Lost comedy films
1920s American films
1920s English-language films